Refat is a unisex given name borne by:

 Refat Amin (born 1953), Bangladesh politician, Member of the Bangladesh Parliament (2014–2018)
 Refat Appazov (1920–2008), Soviet and Russian rocket scientist of Crimean-Tatar descent
 Refat Chubarov (born 1957), Ukrainian politician and leader of the Crimean Tatar national movement
 Refat Mustafaev (1911–1984), Crimean Tatar communist regional party secretary and World War II partisan battalion commissar

See also
 Rifat, a given name